Lucas Jester is a German professional footballer who plays as a forward, most recently for Tanjong Pagar United of the Singaporean S.League in 2014.

Career
Making his senior debut for Tanjong Pagar United in a 2014 S.League fixture fronting Woodlands Wellington, Jester was seen to have made a tangible impact after being substituted on in the 88th minute with a few decisive passes to help the Jaguars' attack.

References

External links 
 

Living people
German footballers
Association football forwards
Singapore Premier League players
Tanjong Pagar United FC players
German expatriate footballers
German expatriate sportspeople in Singapore
Expatriate footballers in Singapore
German expatriate sportspeople in Australia
Expatriate soccer players in Australia
Year of birth missing (living people)